"Cassis" is a maxi-single and major label debut by The Gazette released on King Records, initially released as an A-type and a B-type, the A-type containing a music video for the song "Cassis", the B-type containing a bonus track. After these had both gone out of print, a regular type was released, containing only the A-side song and the B-side song.

Track listing

Cassis type A
Disc one
 "Cassis" - 6:44
 "Toguro" (蜷局; Coil) - 4:08
Disc two (DVD)
 "Cassis" - 6:44

Cassis type B
 "Cassis" - 6:44
 "Toguro" (蜷局; Coil) - 4:08
 "Bite to All" - 3:25

Cassis regular type
 "Cassis" - 6:44
 "Toguro" (蜷局; Coil) - 4:08

Notes
 "Cassis" is also featured on the album Nil, released a few months after this single.
 The music video of Cassis was filmed in Riegersburg, Austria.
 The single reached a peak mark of #6 on the Japanese Oricon Weekly Charts.

References

2005 singles
The Gazette (band) songs
King Records (Japan) singles
2005 songs
Song articles with missing songwriters